Woman in a Lamp Shade  is a 1983 collection of short stories by Australian writer Elizabeth Jolley. The collection contains the following stories: 
 "Pear Tree Dance"
 "Adam's Bride" (formerly titled "The Bench") from Meanjin, 1979
 "Hilda's Wedding" from Looselicks, 1976
 "Two Men Running" from The Bulletin, 1981
 "Uncle Bernard's Proposal" from Landfall, 1973
 "Paper Children"
 "The Play Reading"from Australian Good Housekeeping, 1981
 "The Libation"
 "One Christmas Knitting" from Memories of Childhood edited by Lee White, 1978
 "Butter Butter Butter for a Boat"
 "Woman in a Lampshade" from Westerly, 1979
 "Wednesdays and Fridays" from Quadrant, 1981
 "Dingle the Fool" from Quadrant, 1972
 "The Representative"
 "Clever and Pretty"
 "The Shed" from New Country edited by Bruce Bennett, 1976
 "The Last Crop"

References 

Australian short story collections
1983 short story collections